Kunzang Choden (born 14 August 1984) is a Bhutanese sports shooter. She competed in the Women's 10 metre air rifle event at the 2012 Summer Olympics. She currently is the coach of Olympic qualifier Lenchu Kunzang.

References

External links
 

1984 births
Living people
People from Thimphu
Bhutanese female sport shooters
Olympic shooters of Bhutan
Shooters at the 2012 Summer Olympics